The Canoas River, also known as Sertão River, is a river of Santa Catarina state in southeastern Brazil. It is one of two branches formed by the Praia Grande River, which recombine to form the Mampituba.

See also
List of rivers of Santa Catarina

References

Rivers of Santa Catarina (state)